Vézins-de-Lévézou (Languedocien: Vesinh) is a commune in the Aveyron department in southern France.

The Château de Vézins is a historical castle. The first fortress was built in 1120 by Vésian de Vézins to command the Lévézou district. Following a disastrous fire in 1642, the only remains of this original castle are the vaulted rooms of the ground floor. The castle was redeveloped in the Renaissance style.

Population

See also
Communes of the Aveyron department

References

Communes of Aveyron
Aveyron communes articles needing translation from French Wikipedia